XHMK-FM is a radio station on 104.3 FM in Huixtla, Chiapas. The station is owned by Grupo Radio Comunicación and is known as La Poderosa with a grupera format.

History

XHMK began as XEMK-AM 1490, with a concession awarded on June 19, 1965. It was owned by Juana María Infante and later by Radio Progreso de Huixtla, S.A. By the early 2000s, XEMK had moved to 930 kHz.

As part of wholesale format and operator changes at within the stations now operated by Grupo Radio Comunicación in August 2019, XHMK became "La Poderosa", dropping the La Bestia Grupera brand associated with Grupo Audiorama.

References

Radio stations in Chiapas
Radio stations established in 1965